Where Pigeons Go to Die is a 1990 made-for-television film written and directed by Michael Landon based on the novel by R. Wright Campbell. The film score was composed by Leonard Rosenman.

The film stars Art Carney and was nominated for two Emmy awards:
 Outstanding Cinematography for a Miniseries or a Special (Haskell B. Boggs)
 Outstanding Lead Actor in a Miniseries or a Special (Art Carney)

Most of the crew was taken from Landon's three previous television shows.

The film was shot in and around Lawrence, Kansas and Overland Park, Kansas, and was the last Michael Landon production for NBC.

Plot
A man (Michael Landon) recalls his childhood, and how he and his grandfather (Art Carney) trained and raced homing pigeons. One special pigeon taught him to appreciate the value of home.

References

1990 films
1990 television films
NBC network original films
Films shot in Kansas
Films scored by Leonard Rosenman
Films directed by Michael Landon